S-K-O, originally known as Schuyler, Knobloch and Overstreet, was an American country music vocal group consisting of Thom Schuyler, J. Fred Knobloch, and Paul Overstreet. The original line-up recorded one album for MTM Records and charted three country hits, including the number one "Baby's Got a New Baby". After Overstreet departed in 1987 for a solo career, he was replaced with Craig Bickhardt, and the group was renamed Schuyler, Knobloch, and Bickhardt, or S-K-B for short. The renamed group released one album and four singles before disbanding in 1989.

Biography
Thom Schuyler, J. Fred Knobloch, and Paul Overstreet were three Nashville, Tennessee-based songwriters who got together to form the group in 1986. After the release of their first single, they shortened their name simply to S-K-O. When Overstreet left the group in 1987 to pursue a solo career, he was replaced by Craig Bickhardt and they changed their name to Schuyler, Knobloch & Bickhardt or S-K-B for short. S-K-B disbanded when their record label, MTM Records, shut down in 1989. Since then, Thom Schuyler became the vice president of RCA Nashville (a position from which he retired in 1994), while Knobloch and Bickhardt continued their songwriting careers.

Discography

Albums

Singles

Music videos

References

External links
Thom Schuyler's official website
Paul Overstreet's official website
Craig Bickhardt's official website
J Fred Knobloch's official website

Country music groups from Tennessee
Musical groups established in 1986
American musical trios
Vocal trios
MTM Records artists
1986 establishments in Tennessee
Musical groups disestablished in 1989